Hoste Inlet is a settlement on West Falkland, in the Falkland Islands. It is on the far south west of the island, and Port Stephens is the nearest other settlement. The former settlement of Port Albemarle is just across a small isthmus.

References

Populated places on West Falkland